The following is a list of the governors and governors general of Canada. Though the present-day office of the Governor General of Canada is legislatively covered under the Constitution Act, 1867 and legally constituted by the Letters Patent, 1947, the institution is, along with the institution of the Crown it represents, the oldest continuous and uniquely Canadian institution in Canada, having existed in an unbroken line since the appointment of Samuel de Champlain in 1627.

Viceroys of Canada, 1541–1627

Governors of New France, 1627–1663

Governors general of New France, 1663–1760

Governors of the Province of Quebec, 1760–1786

Governors general of the Canadas/British North America, 1786–1841

Governors general of the Province of Canada, 1841–1867

Governors general of Canada, 1867–present

Administrators 

The following is a list of Administrators of the Government, Justices of the Supreme Court of Canada who were acting governors appointed as the result of the death, resignation, prolonged absence of the sitting viceroy, or for any other reason:

 Chief Justice Lyman Duff between the death of Lord Tweedsmuir and the arrival of Lord Athlone (February 11 to June 21, 1940);
 Senior Puisne Justice Patrick Kerwin during the absence of Governor General Lord Alexander and Chief Justice Thibaudeau Rinfret (June 11 to August 2, 1951).
 Chief Justice Thibaudeau Rinfret once the commission was ended on the departure of the Lord Alexander and the installation of Vincent Massey (January 28 to February 28, 1952);
 Chief Justice Robert Taschereau following the death of Georges Vanier to the installation of Roland Michener (March 5 to April 17, 1967);
 Chief Justice Bora Laskin while Governor General Jules Léger was recovering from a stroke (July 2 to December 9, 1974);
 Chief Justice Richard Wagner, from the resignation of Julie Payette to the installation of Mary Simon (January 22, 2021 to July 26, 2021).

See also 

 List of Canadian monarchs
 List of vicereines in Canada
 Viceregal consort of Canada
 Viceregal eponyms in Canada

References

External links
 Governor General of Canada > Former Governors General
 Department of Canadian Heritage > A Crown of Maples – Appendices > Governors/Governors General of Canada

Canada
Canada, List of governors general of
1578 establishments in Canada
1603 disestablishments in Canada
1627 establishments in Canada